Permisi (Permeź) is a village (selo) in Bolshebereznikovsky District of the Republic of Mordovia, Russia.

References

Rural localities in Mordovia
Bolshebereznikovsky District
Karsunsky Uyezd